Dianne Wiest (born March 28, 1948) is an American stage, film, and television actress. Over the course of her career, her performances have earned her  Academy Award, Golden Globe, and Primetime Emmy Award wins and nominations, among many others.

Major Associations

Academy Awards

BAFTA Awards

Emmy Awards (Primetime)

Golden Globe Awards

Screen Actors Guild Awards

Industry awards

Film Independent Spirit Awards

Gotham Awards

National Board of Review

Sundance Film Festival

Critic Awards

Boston Society of Film Critics

Chicago Film Critics Association

Dallas-Fort Worth Film Critics Association

Drama Desk Awards

Kansas City Film Critics Circle Awards

Los Angeles Film Critics Association

National Society of Film Critics

New York Film Critics Circle

Society of Texas Film Critics

Southeastern Film Critics Association

Miscellaneous awards

20/20 Awards

American Comedy Awards

Awards Circuit Community Awards

Academy of Science Fiction, Fantasy & Horror Films

Blockbuster Entertainment Awards

CableACE Awards

Chlotrudis Awards

Gracie Allen Awards

New York Women in Film & Television

Online Film & Television Association

Satellite Awards

Theatre World Awards

Women's Image Network Awards

Notes

References

Wiest, Dianne